The Archdiocese of Rhodes is a Latin Church ecclesiastical territory or archdiocese of the Catholic Church in Greece. The archdiocese is directly exempt to the Holy See and not part of an ecclesiastical province. It was at various times a titular see and later a metropolitan see. It has its cathedra within St. Francis of Assisi Cathedral in the eponymous capital of the island of Rhodes.

One former cathedral of "Our Lady of the Castle" was turned into a mosque during the Ottoman period and is now a museum, the other former cathedral of St. John was turned into a Greek Orthodox church.

History 
An ancient diocese was established in Rhodes around 200 AD and promoted to Metropolitan Archdiocese around 400 AD. It continues as the Greek Orthodox Metropolis of Rhodes.

A Catholic see was established on the island when it became the seat of the Knights Hospitaller in 1308 following their conquest of Rhodes. In 1523, with the fall of the island to the Ottoman Empire, it was suppressed as a residential diocese but turned into a titular see.

On March 28, 1928, it was restored as non-metropolitan, exempt Archdiocese of Rhodos on the territory of the suppressed Apostolic Prefecture of Rhodes and adjacent islands.

Episcopal ordinaries 
 Metropolitan Archbishops of Rhodes
 Belijan (? – 1324.09.26), later Metropolitan Archbishop of Salona (Croatia) (1324.09.26 – 1328.01.28)
 Ugo de Scuria, Friars Minor (O.F.M.) (1351.06.20 – 1361.12.15), later Metropolitan Archbishop of Ragusa (Croatia) (1361.12.15 – 1370.07.12), finally Archbishop-Bishop of Ostuni (Italy) (1370.07.12 – death 1374)
 

...

 Titular Archbishops of Rhodes 

...
Francesco Niccolini, (1685.09.10 – 1692.02.04)

...

 Exempt Archbishops of Rhodes 
 Archbishop Florido Ambrogio Acciari, Friars Minor (O.F.M.) as Apostolic Administrator (1928 – 1929)
 Giovanni Maria Emilio Castellani, O.F.M. (1929.01.15 – 1937.03.25)
 Friar Pier Crisologo Fabi, O.F.M. as Apostolic Administrator (1937 – 1938)
 Florido Ambrogio Acciari, O.F.M. (1938.03.30 – 1970.03.10)
 Friar Michail-Petros Franzidis, O.F.M. as Apostolic Administrator (1970 – 1992)
 Archbishop Nikolaos Foskolos as Apostolic Administrator (1992 – 2014)
 Sevastianos Rossolatos as Apostolic Administrator (12 August 2014 – 14 July 2021)
 Theodoros Kontidis, S.J. as Apostolic Administrator (14 July 2021 – present)

See also 
 Roman Catholicism in Greece
 Panagia tou Kastrou

References

Sources
 GCatholic.org, with episcopal incumbent biography links
 Catholic Hierarchy
 Diocese website

Former Roman Catholic dioceses in Europe
Roman Catholic Archdiocese of Rhodes
Roman Catholic dioceses in Greece
Christian organizations established in 1928
Roman Catholic dioceses and prelatures established in the 20th century